The 2006–07 season was Adelaide United FC's the club's second season in the A-League (third season in top flight football). The club had success winning the 2005–06 Adelaide United FC season Premiership and finishing third in the finals series. Adelaide began their 2006–07 season with a 2–2 draw with local club Adelaide Galaxy and a 2–1 win over a State Select in their pre-season fixtures. This was followed up with a highly successful pre-season cup which the Reds won, defeating Central Coast Mariners on penalties in the grand final.

Adelaide United finished second in the 2006–07 Premiership. Competing for the Championship, The Reds advanced to the 2006–07 Grand Final after winning 4–3 on penalties (1–1 AET) against the Newcastle Jets. Adelaide United played Melbourne Victory at the Telstra Dome in the Grand Final on 18 February 2007 losing 6–0 whilst playing most of the game with only 10 men after captain Ross Aloisi was sent off for his second bookable offence. Following a controversial post grand final interview, Ross Aloisi was sacked as captain of Adelaide United, and left the club to move to Wellington Phoenix. He was replaced as captain by Angelo Costanzo on 22 February 2007. At the same as this announcement was made, it was also announced that coach John Kosmina would be sacked. It was widely speculated that Kosmina had been told to resign by the board of Adelaide United the Thursday after the grand final. Assistant Coach Aurelio Vidmar was appointed interim coach. On 22 October 2007, former Adelaide United coach John Kosmina took up the role as the new head coach of Sydney FC.

Review
The 2006–07 season also saw Brazilian international Romário join the club for a four-game guest player stint.

Adelaide United were selected, along with Sydney FC, as the first Australian representatives to play in the 2007 AFC Champions League. They received their Asian berth as A-League premiers.  Adelaide was drawn into Group G with Chinese champion Shandong Luneng Taishan, Korean champions Seongnam Ilhwa Chunma and Vietnamese league and Super Cup champions Gach Dong Tam Long An.

Adelaide lost to Shandong 1–0, defeated Long An 2–0, drew with Seongnam 2–2, then lost to the Korean team 1–0. The Reds broke Shandong's winning streak in a 2–2 draw, before finishing its campaign with a 3–0 win over Long An, thanks to a hat trick from Travis Dodd. This match marked the last Adelaide United appearances of Fernando Rech and Carl Veart as the 1–0 loss to Seongyam knocked Adelaide out of quarter finals contention. Adelaide finished 3rd in its group, ahead of Long An and behind Shandong; with group winner Seongnam making the semi-finals. Dodd scored on 4 occasions, Rech 3 times, and Olyroos players Bruce Djite and Nathan Burns one a piece.

Adelaide United were linked with Brazilian football legend Romário. The 1994 World Cup winner was still attempting to score 1,000 goals and be up there with Pelé as the all-time greatest scorer. Romário, 40, will play for the Reds on a four-week guest stint of which each club is allowed to sign two players. Last year, Sydney FC signed Kazuyoshi "Kazu" Miura for four A-League matches and the Club World Championships and this season they are set to sign Italian forward Benito Carbone. The Newcastle United Jets are also reportedly interested in a guest player, former 1990s English striker Stan Collymore.

The Football Federation Australia has agreed to let Adelaide United sign Romário. This came days after they said no to the Jets in their chase for Collymore. Romário is still playing for Miami FC in the United Soccer Leagues which is America's second division. He is currently on 984 career goals and needs 16 more to reach the 1,000 mark which he said had become an obsession.

It was reported in The Advertiser on Wednesday 27 September 2006, that the Sultan of Brunei, Hassanal Bolkiah had inquired about Romário. The Sultan could offer much bigger money than Adelaide United. The article also stated the matches that Romário is most likely to play. Under the deal that United wished to sign him on, Romário would play two matches for his current club Miami FC against Adelaide United and two days later against an FFSA Select Team with both of these matches at Hindmarsh Stadium. He would then play four A-League matches for United against the Mariners in Gosford, followed by three home matches against Melbourne, New Zealand and Newcastle. United are also reportedly looking at the option of signing him for the rest of the A-League season.

On Friday 29 September 2006, Adelaide United Football Club released an official statement on their website which confirmed the signing of Romário to a four match guest stint. He will play four A-League matches for United against Central Coast in Gosford, followed by three home matches against Melbourne Victory, NZ Knights and Newcastle Jets.

United signed Jason Spagnuolo and Greg Owens on long-term deals after they impressed during their 4-week stay in the 2005–06 season. Qu Shengqing originally left Adelaide to return to China but has now signed for another A-League season. Nathan Burns joins Adelaide from the AIS.

Adelaide United played two major pre-season friendlies. They began with a 2–2 draw with Galaxy and played in front of a 1,500 strong crowd at the Marden Sports Complex against a Super League Select.

United performed well in the group stage beating Melbourne Victory before draws against the Mariners and Perth. They failed to take advantage of the Bonus Round offer only beating the NZ Knights 1–0. This meant that they would meet Sydney FC in Wollongong, continuing a strong rivalry formed in Season One. Adelaide's Kristian Rees scored an injury time winner to send the Reds through to their first ever final. United won this match on penalties after Andre Gumprecht cancelled out Carl Veart's spectacular overhead bicycle kick. Stewart Petrie was the unlucky Mariner to miss while Carl Veart was the hero with the winning spot kick.

Adelaide United were looking to build upon their successful opening season in which they won the minor premiership. They choked in the finals however and their aim for season two was to achieve results in the Finals Series. They open the season with away matches in Melbourne and Auckland.

A thoroughly deserved win for Melbourne who dominated. The three Brazilians impressed particularly Alessandro who won the penalty and gave Adelaide's Richie Alagich a lot of trouble down the flanks. For Adelaide the likes of Qu Shengqing, Travis Dodd, Carl Veart did not produce their best football and Adelaide's attack was toothless.

Another lackluster performance from Adelaide as the much-improved New Zealand Knights stole all three points with an early contender for goal of the season from Ghanaian midfielder Malik Buari. Sean Devine, Jonti Richter and Darren Bazeley were all solid contributors for New Zealand while the entire Adelaide side played well below their best.

Adelaide returns to form with an emphatic 5–1 demolition of the Newcastle United Jets on a cold, wet Friday night at Hindmarsh Stadium. Nothing went right for the Jets as United scored three times in the first half hour with all three goals beginning with set pieces. Fernando got the ball rolling as he turned in a Jason Spagnuolo free kick. Robert Cornthwaite followed up a Ross Aloisi free kick and then Chinese striker Qu scored directly from a free kick. Jets striker Bridge pulled one back for the Jets in the second half but defender Durante scored a horrendous own goal. Bobby Petta impressed on his debut match for the Reds.

Adelaide United put in their second successive impressive performance and they were simply too good for the Glory who seemed to have no power going forward without injured stars Stan Lazaridis and Bobby Despotovski. United created chances from the first whistle with Dodd going close before Fernando opened the scoring with a shot in the 14th minute which beat goalkeeper Aleks Vrteski. The second goal came as the Glory defence sat back allowing superb winger Dodd too much time and space and he blasted the ball straight through Vrteski to make it 2–0. United added the third goal five minutes after the interval as Fernando's shot which was heading wide of the target took a wicked deflection off Jamie Coyne and fooled Vrteski. Coyne was credited with the own goal. United then created late chances through subs Bobby Petta and debutant Dez Giraldi but the score remained at 3–0.

Queensland dominated their match against Adelaide and certainly showed why they are title contenders early in the season. Their five-man attack consisting of Ante Milicic, Reinaldo, Yuning Zhang, Simon Lynch and Dario Vidosic is certain to score goals this season and only some outstanding saves by Reds keeper Robert Bajic kept Adelaide in the game. Qu Shengqing will come under the FFA review panel's scrutiny for his headbutt on Roar captain Chad Gibson. At the end of the match a flurry of Queensland chances, most of which fell to Zhang, were not enough to secure the points for Queensland.

A poor match from Adelaide allowed Sydney FC to move four points clear of them on the A-League ladder. Sydney FC started the match well with Alex Brosque and Benito Carbone. Travis Dodd had the first chance of the game in a one-on-one with Clint Bolton but the speedy United winger took a bad touch allowing Bolton to make a save. In the 38th minute, Carbone was allowed too much time and space and he lobbed a ball over to Zadkovich who tapped the ball past Bajic. United returned from the half time interval as the better team and they only had to wait eight minutes before Nathan Burns scored his first A-League goal. Dodd made all the hard work go to waste however, when three minutes later he scored an own goal attempting to clear a ball which posed no danger. Carbone set up the third with a backheel which broke down the entire defence allowing substitute Petrovski to make the score 3–1. Then Carbone finally scored a goal for himself. He broke free on the right hand side and the flag stayed down allowing him to slot the ball past Bajic. 4–1 to Sydney FC. Jason Spagnuolo and Carl Veart missed two easy chances to make the scoreline less embarrassing and Adelaide's defence knows it must improve with the dangerous Damian Mori coming to Adelaide next Friday night.

A much improved performance from United after the 4–1 drubbing at home by Sydney FC. The Mariners started as the better side but United scored the opener as Jason Spagnuolo made the most of a defensive error by Damian Mori to provide the cross from which Carl Veart headed home from close range. Central Coast hit back a quarter of an hour later as Australian football legend and Socceroos all-time top scorer Damian Mori received a good ball, beat Ang Costanzo for pace and rounded 'keeper Robbie Bajic before celebrating his return to Hindmarsh Stadium in front of 10,000 booing Reds supporters. Adelaide after the half time break and threw absolutely everything at CCM with Matthew Kemp and Bobby Petta having almost identical chances saved by Vukovic. Greg Owens and Nathan Burns also missed crucial opportunities. Petta provided a good corner and tall centre back Kristian Rees headed home for his first goal of the season. Noel Spencer missed the Mariners' best chance of the half and United wrapped the game up with Carl Veart setting up a free Nathan Burns who ran the length of one half and slotted the ball past Vukovic.

One of the matches of the season as the Melbourne Victory attempted to maintain a 100% record against an Adelaide side nearing the top of their game. The match got off to a fiery start as Ross Aloisi and Grant Brebner received yellow cards in the opening minute. The Victory had the better of the chances during the match, yet it was the Reds who came away with the 3 points as a counter-attacking move saw Greg Owens run free and slot the ball past 'keeper Theoklitos. The main talking point however, was an altercation between Victory captain Kevin Muscat and Adelaide coach John Kosmina. The ball had gone out of play for a Melbourne throw-in and with his side 0–1 down, Muscat wanted to retrieve the ball quickly. The ball had gone under Kosmina's chair and as the Reds manager was picking it up, Muscat sent the Kossie sprawling to the turf. Kosmina then got up and grabbed Muscat by the throat. Kosmina was sent to the stands while Muscat received a booking. Kosmina was given a 6-week suspension, with two suspended. The Victory still sit atop the A-League ladder while United are third.

An impressive attacking performance as Adelaide go outright second on the A-League ladder. Rising stars Nathan Burns and Bruce Djite showed that they can do whatever Fernando and Qu can do. Jason Spagnuolo more assists setting up goals for Burns and Petta. However, the defensive effort wasn't as good as the Hindmarsh crowd has come to expect with poor defending giving Noah Hickey the Knights second of the season and Adam van Dommele scoring an embarrassing own goal to make matters worse. Dodd sealed the win with a late header which beat Milosevic.

Another match that bore similarities to the Round 5 match against the Roar. Newcastle dominated possession but Adelaide continued to defend well. Bajic made six saves and defenders scrambled to cover him even when he was beaten. As in round five, Adelaide had to absorb pressure, the Jets had 24 shots at goal. Unlike the Queenslanders however, Newcastle punished Adelaide for its lapses in defence. At 1–1, 88 minutes into the match, Carl Veart had a chance to steal the game and cement second place on the ladder with his third spot kick of the night. The Jets had conceded two penalties with the first having to be retaken. Veart blasted the would-be match sealer over the bar and a minute later the Jets scored the winner instead.

Adelaide born Mimi Saric opened the scoring early in the first half due to some ball watching from the Adelaide defense but Carl Veart equalised literally straight after Saric scored after Spagnuolo was being held in the box. Eight minutes later Greg Owens scored a great goal after Travis Dodd burned down the right win and cross along to Veart, who missed the ball only for Greg Owens to place a perfect shot into the goal. Greg Owens missed another chance to put his side ahead but headed wide from 3 yards. On half time Perth were awarded a penalty after a player was pushed in the Perth box. Bobby scored from the spot and the teams were equal at half time. Early in the second half Matty Kemp scored a goal from a narrow angle where he jumped and kicked the ball over the keepers head only for it to sneak under the crossbar and win the game.

A deserved win for Adelaide who dominated. Adelaide dominated play despite early shots from Queensland and the Roar hardly tested Bajic until the end of the second half. Travis Dodds goal came from a long pass from Greg Owens deep in the midfield to Carl Veart who shrugged off his defender and delivered a ball across the face of goal to give Travis the easiest of goals.

Muscat scored from the spot early in the half after Bajic needlessly kicked Fred in the gut while retrieving the ball. Fernando scored a header from a cross from Matthew Kemp to equalize and Adelaide looked to score again. Half time came for AUFC as they were gaining momentum. The game was 50/50 after half time until the aging Adelaide midfield began to tire and in the 61st minute Allsopp scored due and in the 86th minute Fred scored after his 1v1 shot was blocked by Beltrame, but Fred scored on the rebound.

Gao Leilei scored in the 16th minute after Richie Alagich started to wander and entered the 6-yard box without any pressure and slotted the ball past Beltrame's near post. Adelaide had chances and Spagnuolo hit the bar but in the 71st minute Greg Owens passed to Travis Dodd in the midfield and Travis out dribbled the defense to deliver a perfect ball back to Greg Owens whose shot hit the ball then went in off the keeper.

One of the best ever games of Hindmarsh and Romario's departure was a great game. In the 15th minute the young Spagnuolo skinned two defenders, feinted past Eagleton to deliver a shot at goal that Covic parried away. Luckily Romario was Johnny-on-the-spot and displaced the rebound. Mark Bridge scored a goal in the 59th minute and straight after kick off, Alagich booted the ball down the Spagnuolo who passed it to Fernando, who miss hit the ball and wrong footed Covic to deliver a very lucky goal. Matt Thompson scored after skinning Rees and powering the ball into the top of the net. This was not enough to stop AUFC as soon after Owens received the ball from Romario on the edge of the box, wrong footed his marker and shot a ball that subtly curved into the top right-hand corner.

This match was Diego's debut. Travis Dodd was brought down on the edge of the box and Petta took the free kick. Petta crossed to an unmarked Diego who headed the ball into Fernando's chest and the ball went through Bolton's legs. Soon after Beltrame denied Coricas header with a diving save and Adelaide took second place.

Adelaide scored in the 10th minute thanks to some wing-play from former Celtic star Bobby Petta who crossed the ball across the goal to Burns who scored an easy tap in. After half time Kwasnik missed a penalty after Kemp hand-balled in the box and straight after Burns scored his second of the night with a cheeky feint to trick the keeper. Soon after Burns made his own goal after passing to Djite who passed to Petta, who rolled the ball through the Mariners defense to give Burnsy a relatively easy goal. Pondeljak's goal came after a messed up clearance by Beltrame. Beltrame kicked it straight to Pondeljak who showed instinct and skill by perfectly placing it above Bells head and ending his hope for his clean sheet. Djite hit the bar from a stunning volley from distance but failed to score. This game cemented Adelaide's second-place finish.

Players

Transfers

Transfers in

Loans in

Transfers out

Loans out

Squad statistics

Appearances and goals

{| class="wikitable sortable plainrowheaders" style="text-align:center"
|-
! rowspan="2" |
! rowspan="2" |
! rowspan="2" style="width:180px;" |Name
! colspan="2" style="width:180px;" |A-League
! colspan="2" style="width:180px;" |Pre-Season Challenge Cup
! colspan="2" style="width:180px;" |AFC Champions League
! colspan="2" style="width:180px;" |Total
|-
!
!Goals
!
!Goals
!
!Goals
!
!Goals
|-
|1
|GK
! scope="row" | Daniel Beltrame

|10+1
|0

|2
|0

|3
|0

!16
!0
|-
|2
|DF
! scope="row" | Richie Alagich

|18+3
|0

|6
|0

|6
|0

!33
!0
|-
|3
|DF
! scope="row" | Kristian Rees

|0
|0

|0
|0

|6
|0

!6
!0
|-
|4
|DF
! scope="row" | Angelo Costanzo

|18+4
|0

|4+1
|0

|6
|0

!33
!0
|-
|5
|DF
! scope="row" | Michael Valkanis

|22+1
|0

|6
|0

|6
|0

!34
!0
|-
|6
|DF
! scope="row" | Cássio

|0
|0

|0
|0

|0
|0

!0
!0
|-
|7
|MF
! scope="row" | Lucas Pantelis

|0
|0

|0
|0

|1+3
|0

!4
!0
|-
|8
|FW
! scope="row" | Carl Veart

|23+1
|5

|6
|3

|1+2
|0

!33
!8
|-
|9
|DF
! scope="row" | Matthew Kemp

|14+5
|1

|4+1
|0

|4+1
|0

!29
!0
|-
|10
|FW
! scope="row" | Fernando

|20+1
|6

|0
|0

|4
|3

!25
!9
|-
|12
|MF
! scope="row" | Greg Owens

|12+9
|4

|6
|0

|0
|0

!27
!4
|-
|13
|MF
! scope="row" | Travis Dodd

|20+4
|4

|6
|1

|6
|4

!36
!9
|-
|15
|FW
! scope="row" | Nathan Burns

|15+6
|6

|0+3
|0

|5
|1

!29
!7
|-
|16
|MF
! scope="row" | Bobby Petta

|8+7
|1

|0
|0

|0+1
|0

!16
!1
|-
|18
|DF
! scope="row" | Robert Cornthwaite

|6+2
|1

|6
|0

|0+1
|0

!15
!1
|-
|19
|FW
! scope="row" | Shengqing Qu

|6+1
|1

|3
|1

|0
|0

!10
!1
|-
|20
|GK
! scope="row" | Robert Bajic

|15
|0

|4
|0

|3
|0

!22
!0
|-
|21
|MF
! scope="row" | Jason Spagnuolo

|15+6
|0

|5+1
|0

|0+1
|0

!28
!0
|-
|23
|FW
! scope="row" | Dez Giraldi

|0+1
|0

|0
|0

|1+3
|0

!5
!0
|-
|25
|FW
! scope="row" | Bruce Djite

|0+8
|0

|0+2
|0

|5
|1

!15
!1
|-
|26
|DF
! scope="row" | Diego Walsh

|5+1
|0

|0
|0

|2
|0

!8
!0
|-
!colspan="16"|Players sold but featured this season
|-
|6
|MF
! scope="row" | Ross Aloisi

|10+3
|1

|0+3
|1

|0
|0

!16
!2
|-
|11
|FW
! scope="row" | Romário

|4
|1

|0
|0

|0
|0

!5
!1
|-
|14
|DF
! scope="row" | Aaron Goulding

|9+3
|0

|6
|0

|3
|0

!21
!0
|-
|17
|DF
! scope="row" | Adam van Dommele

|2+3
|0

|0+4
|0

|3
|0

!12
!0
|-
|30
|GK
! scope="row" | Ben Moore

|0
|0

|0
|0 

|0
|0

!0
!0
|}

Pre-season

Friendlies

Pre-Season Challenge Cup

Competitions

Overview

{|class="wikitable" style="text-align:left"
|-
!rowspan=2 style="width:140px;"|Competition
!colspan=8|Record
|-
!style="width:40px;"|
!style="width:40px;"|
!style="width:40px;"|
!style="width:40px;"|
!style="width:40px;"|
!style="width:40px;"|
!style="width:40px;"|
!style="width:70px;"|
|-
|A-League

|-
|Pre-Season Challenge Cup

|-
|AFC Champions League

|-
!Total

A-League

League table

Matches

Finals Series

AFC Champions League

Group stage

References

External links
 Official website

Adelaide United FC seasons
2006–07 A-League season by team